Moisés David Corozo Cañizares (born 25 October 1992) is an Ecuadorean footballer who plays for L.D.U. Quito in the Ecuadorian Serie A as a centre back.

References

External links

1992 births
Ecuadorian footballers
Ecuadorian expatriate footballers
C.D. Trofense players
C.D. Cuenca footballers
C.S.D. Macará footballers
L.D.U. Quito footballers
Liga Portugal 2 players
Ecuadorian Serie A players
Ecuadorian Serie B players
Living people
Ecuadorian expatriate sportspeople in Portugal
Expatriate footballers in Portugal
Sportspeople from Guayaquil
Association football central defenders
C.S. Norte América footballers